Eugenia Grandet may refer to:

 Eugenia Grandet (1918 film), an Italian silent historical film, based on the novel Eugénie Grandet
 Eugenia Grandet (1946 film), an Italian historical drama film, based on the novel Eugénie Grandet
 Eugenia Grandet (1953 film), a Mexican drama film, based on the novel Eugénie Grandet

See also 
 Eugénie Grandet, a 1833 novel by Honoré de Balzac
 Eugénie Grandet (film), a 1994 French film directed by Jean-Daniel Verhaeghe